Benoit Heitz (born 1985), known by his stage name Surkin, is a French musician, record producer, DJ and art director. He is known for his electronic music compositions under the name Surkin and GENER8ION.

Life and career 
Surkin was born in Arles, the south of France. He studied contemporary art at Villa Arson in Nice before moving to Paris to start his music career.

He first gained attention in 2006 with his first releases on the French Institubes music label, DJ performances in clubs and music festivals such as Coachella, Fuji Rock Festival and Ultra Music Festival, and remixes for artists like Paul Johnson, Justice, Chromeo, DJ Mehdi, Kavinsky. During this time, Surkin's productions are notable for their use of heavily modified vocal samples and the use of cut-up.

In 2011 he launched the independent record label Marble along with Para One and Bobmo.

Surkin released his first album "USA" late 2011, which was called by dance magazine Mixmag "one of the most exciting concept albums of the 21st century". The album is influenced by Detroit techno, 80's electro and Chicago House, featuring vocals by Ann Saunderson (from Inner City) and Marshall Jefferson collaborator Kevin Irving.

In 2015 he released the E.P. "The New International Sound Part II" featuring vocals by M.I.A, under the name GENER8ION. The subsequent music video, directed by Inigo Westmeier and executive produced by French director Romain Gavras, was shot at the Chinese fighting school of Shaolin Tagou and featured a synchronized choreography by 36,000 of their students.

In 2016, Surkin composed the original music of the Nike campaign 'Da Da Ding' which won numerous awards at international advertising competitions  and scored the launch video of the iPhone 7 "Don't Blink" which was shown in September at the Apple keynote in Cupertino. In March 2016 he released a visual magazine called  "Unite Or Perish" and a new EP under the name GENER8ION called "GN8003" on French label Bromance.

In 2017 Surkin collaborated with fashion brand Dior to create the music of their campaign Poison Club and composed the music of the global Mercedes-Benz campaign "Never Stop Improving" featuring Roger Federer.

Awards 

 2017: D&AD Awards – 'Nike, Da Da Ding' – Wood Pencil - Use of Music for Film Advertising 
 2017: Cannes Lion – 'Nike, Da Da Ding' – Bronze Lion - Use of Original Music

Discography

Production
 M.I.A. - Bring The Noize (2013, Interscope)

Albums
 Action Replay (2007, Institubes/Klee)
 USA (2011, Marble/Ed Banger/EMI Japan)
 USA Club Mixes (2012, Marble)

EP and singles
 Ghetto Obsession (2006, Institubes)
 Play Do / I Joke On You (2006, Arcade Mode)
 Radio Fireworks (2006, Institubes)
 Fireworks Refired (2007, Institubes)
 Next of Kin (2008, Institubes)
 Next of Kin, Mark II (2008, Institubes)
 Silver Island (2010, Institubes)
 Fan Out Remixes (2010, Institubes)
 Ultra Light (2011, Marble)
 Lose Yourself (2012, Marble)
 I Want You Back (with Todd Edwards) (2012, Sound Pellegrino)
 Advanced Entertainment System (2013, Marble)

Remixes

References

External links
 Surkin's Facebook Page
 Surkin's Twitter
 Daily Music Guide review of Next Of Kin Mark II
 Surkin at Discogs.com

French DJs
French record producers
1985 births
Living people